Joseph Marie Louis Guy Labrie (August 11, 1920 — May 12, 1974) was a Canadian ice hockey player who played 42 games in the National Hockey League for the Boston Bruins and New York Rangers between 1943 and 1945. The rest of his career, which lasted from 1939 to 1954, was mainly spent in the Quebec Senior Hockey League. He was born in St-Charles Bellechasse, Quebec.

Career statistics

Regular season and playoffs

External links
 

1920 births
1974 deaths
Boston Bruins players
Boston Olympics players
Canadian ice hockey defencemen
Ice hockey people from Quebec
New Haven Eagles players
New York Rangers players
People from Chaudière-Appalaches
Providence Reds players
Quebec Aces (QSHL) players
Sherbrooke Saints players
Canadian expatriates in the United States